Unionville is an unincorporated community in Morgan County, Ohio, United States.

References

Unincorporated communities in Morgan County, Ohio
Unincorporated communities in Ohio